Laura Oakley (July 10, 1879 January 30, 1957) was an American silent film actress.

Biography
Born in Oakland, California, on July 10, 1879, Oakley was signed in 1912 by the Keystone Film Company and starred in about 50 films before her retirement from film in 1920.  She starred with William Garwood in films such as Lord John in New York and The Grey Sisterhood.

In 1913, Oakley was elected police chief of Universal City, California, shortly after it was incorporated, when 8 of the 28 city's official positions were won by women. A little over a year later, she was sworn in as police officer number 99 of Los Angeles.

In September 1915, Oakley married Universal Pictures cinematographer Milton Moore.

Oakley died on January 30, 1957, in Altadena, California, survived by two children and six grandchildren. She was interred at Mountain View Cemetery and Mausoleum, mausoleum section MVMN, map 37, column AN, row 12, in Altadena.

Filmography

Films 
 1916 The Dumb Girl of Portici - Rilla. 
 1916 The League of the Future - Head Sister
 1916 Their Act
 1916 Shackles 
 1916 The Eye of Horus - Head Sister
 1916 Three Fingered Jenny - Head Sister
 1916 The Grey Sisterhood - Head Sister
 1918 Two-Gun Betty - Miss Ambrose. 
 1920 The Vanishing Dagger - Lady Mary Latimer

 The Little Upstart (1915)
 Lord John in New York (1915) as Head Sister
 Dan Cupid: Fixer (1915)
 The Great Ruby Mystery (1915)
 The Rise and Fall of Officer 13 (1915)
 The Tale of His Pants (1915)
 An Idyll of the Hills (1915)
 The Human Menace (1915)
 The Black Box (1915) as Laura
 Changed Lives (1915)
 The Star of the Sea (1915) as Janice
 Her Escape (1914) as Undetermined Role
 Lights and Shadows (1914)
 Her Life's Story (1914) as Sister Agnes
 A Prince of Bavaria (1914)
 Don't Monkey with the Buzz Saw (1914)
 The Bingville Fire Department (1914)
 Fleeing from the Fleas (1914)
 A Disenchantment (1914)
 McBride's Bride (1914)
 Pawns of Destiny (1914)
 Gertie Gets the Cash (1914)
 The Seat of the Trouble (1914)
 Her First Arrest (1914)
 Hawkeye and the Cheese Mystery (1914)
 The Tale of a Dog (1914)
 The Saint and the Singer (1914)
 The Deuce and Two Pair (1914)
 Too Many Cooks (1914)
 The Romance of a Photograph (1914)
 Just Mother (1914)
 The Buccaneers (1913)
 Under the Black Flag (1913)
 Their Two Kids (1913) as Ma Ford
 Memories (1913) as Life's Handmaiden
 The Fight Against Evil (1913)
 The Girl Ranchers (1913)
 Sally Scraggs, Housemaid (1913) as Mrs. Shackleton
 When His Courage Failed (1913) as The Wife
 The Power That Rules (1913)
 A Cowgirl Cinderella (1912)

References

External links

 
 

American film actresses
Actresses from Milwaukee
American silent film actresses
1879 births
1957 deaths
20th-century American actresses